Deloplotela is a genus of moth in the subfamily Arctiinae. It contains the single species Deloplotela minuta, which is found on the Tenimbar Islands.

References

Natural History Museum Lepidoptera generic names catalog

Lithosiini